Ephex Kanana Gichuru (14 December 1986 22 September 2015) was a Kenyan actress and TV host. She was popularly known as Nana Gichuru. As an actress she was known for her roles in television series Noose of Gold, Demigods and How to Find a Husband. As a host, she was to present Interior Designs, a Kenyan reality series, prior to her death. She was also a crew member for Kenya Airways. She had been married to Richard Wainaina just before her death.

Career 
Gichuru starred in several productions like Noose of Gold in 2010 and Demigods in 2011. Her latest production was a role in the comedy How to Find a Husband and the reality show Interior Designs

Death 
At approximately 10am on 22 September 2015, Nana was travelling in her BMW convertible on Eastern Bypass, Utawala, when her car rammed into a truck. She died on the spot. She died at the age of 28. Her death came ten days after she reportedly predicted her own death in her social media pages. Her memorial service was held on 30 September 2015 in Ruaraka Methodist Church. She was buried on 2 October 2015 in her hometown, Kaaga in Meru.

Filmography

References

External links 

1986 births
2015 deaths
Kenyan television actresses
Kenyan film actresses
Kenyan telenovela actresses
Kenyan photographers
21st-century Kenyan actresses
Soap opera actresses